Events from the year 1926 in art.

Events
 Marcel Duchamp's The Bride Stripped Bare by Her Bachelors, Even is accidentally broken.
 Marjorie Watson-Williams moves to Paris and adopts the name Paule Vézelay.

Awards
 Archibald Prize: W B McInnes – Silk and Lace

Works

 Max Beckmann – Quappi in Blue
 H. Chalton Bradshaw with bronzes by Gilbert Ledward – Guards Memorial, London
 Alexander Calder – Cirque Calder (wire sculpture)
 Alexander Stirling Calder – Shakespeare Memorial, Philadelphia, Pennsylvania
 Salvador Dalí – The Basket of Bread
 Charles T. Diamond with relief by John Paulding – Astoria Victory Monument, Astoria, Oregon
 Edwin Dickinson – The Cello Player
 Max Ernst
 The Blessed Virgin Chastises the Infant Jesus before Three Witnesses: A.B., P.E. and the Artist
 The Dove was Right
 Alberto Giacometti – Spoon Woman
 Dora Gordine – Chinese Head (Chia-Chu Chang: The Chinese Philosopher) (bronze)
 Hannah Höch – Love
 Frida Kahlo – Self-portrait in a Velvet Dress
 Ernst Ludwig Kirchner – Brücke bei Wiesen
 René Magritte
 The Difficult Crossing (first version)
 The Musings of a Solitary Walker
 Georges Malkine – Nuit d'Amour
 John Marin - Related to Downtown New York, Movement No. 2 (The Black Sun)
 Henri Matisse – Yellow Odalisque (first version)
 Haig Patigian – Statue of Abraham Lincoln (bronze, San Francisco)
 Dod Procter – Morning
 John Bulloch Souter – The Breakdown

Births
 3 January – Felicitas Kuhn, Austrian illustrator (d. 2022)
 13 January – Craigie Aitchison, Scottish painter (d. 2009)
 17 January – Robert Filliou, French Fluxus artist (d. 1987)
 18 January – Roy Kiyooka, Canadian photographer, artist and poet (d. 1994)
 24 January – Ruth Asawa, American sculptor (d. 2013)
 1 February – Vivian Maier, American street photographer (d. 2009)
 6 April – Gil Kane, Latvian-born cartoonist (d. 2000)
 10 April – Gustav Metzger, German-Jewish born British creator of auto-destructive art and activist (d. 2017)
 26 April – Michael Mathias Prechtl, German illustrator (d. 2003)
 25 May – David Wynne, English figure sculpture (d. 2014)
 6 May – Edward Clark, American abstract expressionist painter (d. 2019)
 13 June 
 Satoru Abe, American sculptor and painter
 George Booth, American cartoonist
 8 August
 Arturo García Bustos, Mexican painter (d. 2017)
 William Foley, American illustrator (d. 2020)
 14 August – René Goscinny, French comic book author, editor and humorist (d. 1977)
 10 September – Beryl Cook, English naïve painter (d. 2008)
 25 September – Sonia Gechtoff, American painter (d. 2018)
 6 October – Petar Omčikus, Serbian artist (d. 2019)
 25 October – Ismail Gulgee, Pakistani painter (d. 2007)
 3 November – Paul Rebeyrolle, French painter (d. 2005)
 5 November – John Berger, English art critic, novelist and painter (d. 2017)
 9 November – Raymond Hains, French artist and photographer (d. 2005)
 10 December – Leon Kossoff, English painter (d. 2019)
 date unknown – David Johnson, American photographer

Deaths
 January 15 – Eugeniusz Zak, Polish painter (b. 1884)
 February 4 – Adolphe Willette, French illustrator (b. 1857)
 April 1 – Charles Angrand, French neo-Impressionist painter (b. 1854)
 June 14 – Mary Cassatt, American painter (b. 1844)
 July 17 – Maximilian Liebenwein, Austro-German painter and illustrator (b. 1869)
 July 24 – T. C. Steele, American Impressionist painter (b. 1847)
 August 25 – Thomas Moran, American painter of the Hudson River School (b. 1837)
 September 28 – Helen Allingham, English watercolour painter and illustrator (b. 1848)
 October 5 – Dorothy Tennant, English painter (b. 1855)
 October 16 – Ignacy Korwin-Milewski, Polish art collector (b. 1846)
 October 24 – Charles Marion Russell, American "cowboy artist" (b. 1864)
 December 5 – Claude Monet, French Impressionist painter (b. 1840)

See also
 1926 in fine arts of the Soviet Union

References

 
Years of the 20th century in art
1920s in art